Ian Frederick Andrew Bell (born 31 October 1947) is a British academic, and has been Professor of American Literature at the University of Keele since 1992.

References

External links 
https://web.archive.org/web/20130803020819/http://www.keele.ac.uk/americanstudies/people/bellian/

1947 births
Living people
Academics of Keele University